Magnús Þór Jónsson (born 7 April 1945), better known by the stage name Megas, is a vocalist, songwriter, and writer who is well known in his native Iceland.

Interest in music
Being an admirer of Elvis Presley, Megas welcomed the arrival of rock & roll to Iceland by 1956, although his interest in music had to be postponed while he attended grammar school in 1960.

While he was young, he studied piano and showed skill at painting. He wrote outrageous short stories for the school papers and in 1968 he also published the sheet music and lyrics to 14 songs, many of which would be released on his first records. As a young bohemian writer, he was inspired by Bob Dylan and Ray Davies, and embarked into songwriting, but his works were not copies of the American or British idols, but in fact, his songs were very original...

First release and controversy
At the beginning of the seventies, his music works were not accessible as Megas only performed them to his friends of the left-wing circles. However, in 1972, Icelandic students in Oslo, Norway helped him release his first album, in which diabolic and satiric lyrics were accompanied by a mild acoustic music played by Norwegian folk musicians. This work caused controversy and his music was banned by the Icelandic national radio, but Megas became a cult figure in the growing alternative scene.

In 1973, as Megas found it difficult to release further albums, he published his verses and music in 3 books.

When his original lyrics were performed with the electric rock band Judas in 1975, Megas managed to reach a broader audience. Several of those songs lampooned the Icelandic cultural legacy, including his two next albums: Millilending (1975) and Fram og aftur blindgötuna (1976), which were much heavier than the first one. He focused on topics that challenged all of Icelandic society's taboos with references made to classical literature and a sarcastic revisionist history. His work polarized the audience. His songs' remarkable poetry and use of Icelandic language proved a novel way to boost Icelandic rock and roll.

In 1977, Megas released Á bleikum náttkjólum with the accompaniment of Spilverk þjóðanna, a popular folk-rock band. This album was voted the best Icelandic album ever made, and with a variety of music styles, it features what many critics considered the first Icelandic punk song. By the end of the seventies, Megas was perceived as a provocateur and his important role in the Icelandic rock scene turned him into a reference for future artists.

He then released a children's song album and a double live album and withdrew from the Icelandic music and started working as a dock worker and graduated from arts school.

Back to music
By 1983 reappeared in the Icelandic music scene by collaborating with other bands and playing as a guest musicians on several albums.

Towards 1985 joined Kukl in a new project was named MegaKukl and toured all over Iceland recording around 20 songs which still remain as unpublished material.After seven years of absence, his solo career was resumed in 1986 with the release of  Í góðri trú.

In 1990 Megas released Hættuleg hljómsveit & glæpakvendið Stella, and started a new project music with Kukl members called Hættuleg hljómsveit (A Dangerous Band), featuring singer Björk as backing vocalist.

The present
Megas has remained one of the most important Icelandic artists. Considered the father of Icelandic rock and acclaimed for his prolific and, sometimes controversial works, his complete discography up to 1990 was reissued in 2002, remastered and with bonus tracks.More recently, he joined  Súkkat to create a new project called Megasukk and released Hús Datt, their debut album in 2005.

Some of the artists that have worked with Megas are the following: Björgvin Gíslason, Björn Bjarnason, Bragi Kristjónsson, Guðlaugur Kristinn Óttarsson, Hjálmar Sveinsson, Páll Baldvin Baldvinsson, Páll Valsson, Svavar Gestsson, Þórður Magnússon, and Þórunn Valdimarsdóttir, among many others.

Trivia
Megas is mentioned in the song "Iceland" by The Fall which appeared on Hex Enduction Hour (1982). The song was recorded in Hljóðriti studio in Iceland in 1981. In a Melody Maker article about The Fall's stay in Iceland called "The Decline and Fall in Iceland" (published 26 September 1981) is this written about Megas: "Our hosts play us tapes of a man with a cracked voice and a Dylanish air and describe him as “the father of Icelandic rock’n’roll”. And they tell us the story of Megas, who ridiculed the sacred Sagas of the land, wrote scathing, surreal lyrics, got heavily into booze and drugs, was barred from radio and shunned by society. In 1979 he released a double album called “Plans For Suicide” announced his retirement, and hasn't performed in public since he's now a dock worker. Mark Smith is entranced by the story, and rivetted by the music. The following day Megas, a pale, gaunt figure, turns up at The Fall's concert at the Austurbæjarbíó and shakes him by the hand. Mark will return to England clutching a parcel of Megas records under his arm."

Solo career
Albums:
1972 - Megas (MGAB 720601), re-release in 2002 with bonus tracks.
1975 - Millilending (Demant D1-002), re-release in 2002 with bonus tracks.
1976 - Fram og aftur blindgötuna (Hrím hf D1-005), re-release in 2002 with bonus tracks.
1977 - Á bleikum náttkjólum (Iðunn 002), with Spilverk Þjóðanna, re-release in 2002 with bonus tracks.
1978 - Nú er ég klæddur og kominn á ról (Iðunn 004), re-release in 2002 with bonus tracks.
1979 - Drög að sjálfsmorði (Iðunn 008–09), live album recorded 1978.
1985 - Megas allur, box set with all previous albums and two bonus LP's with rare and unreleased tracks.
1986 - Í góðri trú (Hitt leikhúsið HITT 011), re-release in 2002 with bonus tracks.
1987 - Loftmynd, re-release in 2002 with bonus tracks.
1988 - Höfuðlausnir, re-release in 2002 with bonus tracks.
1990 - Hættuleg hljómsveit & glæpakvendið Stella (Megas), re-release in 2006 with bonus tracks.
1992 - Þrír blóðdropar, re-release in 2006 with bonus tracks.
1993 - Paradísarfuglinn, best-of compilation.
1994 - Drög að Upprisu (Japis), live album by Megas and Nýdönsk recorded 1993, re-release in 2006 with bonus tracks.
1996 - Til hamingju með fallið
1997 - Fláa veröld 
2000 - Svanasöngur á leiði
2001 - Far... þinn veg
2001 - Haugbrot
2002 - Englaryk í tímaglasi, re-release of Bláir draumar (1988) with bonus tracks.
2002 - Megas 1972–2002, best-of compilation.
2002 - (Kristilega kærleiksblómin spretta í kringum) hitt og þetta, a bonus cd with Megas 1972-2002 with rare and unreleased tracks.
2006 - Passíusálmar í Skálholti (Tindur), live album recorded 2001.
2006 - Greinilegur púls, live album recorded with Hættuleg hljómsveit 1991.
2007 - Frágangur, with Senuþjófarnir.
2007 - Hold er mold, with Senuþjófarnir.
2008 - Á morgun, with Senuþjófarnir.
2009 - Segðu ekki frá (með lífsmarki), live album with Senuþjófarnir, recorded in 2007.
2011 - (Hugboð um) Vandræði, with Senuþjófarnir.
2011 - Aðför að lögum, with Strengir.
2013 - Jeppi á fjalli, with Bragi Valdimar Skúlason.

MegaKukl (1985)
No official releases: - Megas and Kukl recorded about 20 songs but the original tapes are lost.

Hættuleg hljómsveit (1990)
No official releases: - Megas and Kukl recorded some tracks at Púlsinn.

Discography of Megasukk
2005 - Hús Datt

Tribute albums
1997 - Megasarlög by various artists.
2006 - Pældu í því sem pælandi er í by various artists.
2006 - Magga Stína syngur Megas by Magga Stína

Bibliography by Megas
1968 - Megas I (Megas), reprinted in 1973.
1968 - Megas II (Megas), reprinted in 1973.
1973 - Megas III (Megas).
1991 - Textar (Almenna bókafélagið).
1989 - Sól í Norðurmýri: Píslarsaga úr Austurbæ together with Þórunn Valdimarsdóttir, reprinted in 1993.
1994 -  (Mál og menning).
2012 - Megas: Textar 1966–2011 (Reykjavík: JPV).

Related bibliography
Rokksaga Íslands, by Gestur Guðmundsson. Forlagið (1990).

External links
Page about Megas at Tónlist.com
Page about Megas (in Icelandic) on Guðmundur Heiðar Gunnarsson's blog

1945 births
Living people
20th-century Icelandic male singers
21st-century Icelandic male singers
Icelandic writers